Club Deportivo San Lorenzo de Almagro (sometimes referred as San Lorenzo) is a Peruvian football club, playing in the city of Chiclayo, Lambayeque, Peru.

History
The Club Deportivo San Lorenzo de Almagro was founded on March 28, 1928. The club name is in honor of the Argentine sports club San Lorenzo de Almagro.

In the 1969 Copa Perú, the club classified to the National Stage, but was eliminated when finished in 3rd place.

In the 2014 Copa Perú, the club classified to the Provincial Stage, but was eliminated by Unión Atahualpa.

Rivalries
San Lorenzo de Almagro has had a long-standing rivalry with local club Boca Juniors de Chiclayo.

Honours

Regional
Liga Departamental de Lambayeque:
Winners (3): 1967, 1968, 1992

Liga Distrital de Chiclayo:
Winners (7): 1960, 1967, 1968,​ 1987, 1991, 1992, 2014
Runner-up (1): 1977

See also
List of football clubs in Peru
Peruvian football league system

References

Football clubs in Peru
Association football clubs established in 1928
1928 establishments in Peru